Jorge Máximo Arturo Pacheco Matte (born 12 February 1953) is a Chilean economist and politician. He served as minister of Michelle Bachelet's second government (2014−2018), specifically in Energy.

Early life
Born in the capital city Santiago de Chile, Pacheco is the son of Christian-democratic politician, Máximo Pacheco Gómez He attended Saint George's College, school located in Las Condes. He studied at University of Chile, earning a Bachelor of Arts in business administration. He finished in 1976 with the specialty of business manager. He continued there and completed a MBA with a mention in economics. 

He married designer Soledad Flanagan, with whom he fathered four daughters.

Career
At university Pacheco was a member of the Popular Unitary Action Movement (MAPU), a Christian socialist political movement ally of socialist president Salvador Allende from 1970−1973. After the 1973 coup d'état and the military dictatorship, he joined the Socialist Party.

In the late 1990s and 2000s, he was a close collaborator of the presidential campaigns of Ricardo Lagos (1999−00), and Michelle Bachelet (2005−06). However, during those governments, he worked for American pulp and paper company International Paper (2000−2012).

Pacheco returned to Chile in 2013 after leaving the business world. He helped Bachelet in her campaign for the general elections. Once re-elected, she appointed him as Minister of Energy in January; he took office on 11 March 2014.

On 19 October 2016, Pacheco resigned from the ministry to become the generalissimo of Lagos' presidential pre-candidacy.

References

External links
 

1953 births
Living people
University of Chile alumni
20th-century Chilean politicians
21st-century Chilean politicians
Socialist Party of Chile politicians